Health Promotion Practice is a bimonthly peer-reviewed public health journal covering the field of public health, especially the practical application of health promotion and education. The editor-in-chief is Kathleen Roe (San Jose State University). It was established in 2000 and is published by SAGE Publications on behalf of the Society for Public Health Education.

Abstracting and indexing
The journal is abstracted and indexed in:
 CINAHL
 Index Medicus/MEDLINE/PubMed
 PsycINFO

References

External links
 

SAGE Publishing academic journals
English-language journals
Public health journals
Publications established in 2000
Quarterly journals
Health promotion